Return of the 38 Gang (also known as Gangsters) is a 1977 Italian poliziottesco film directed by Giuseppe Vari. The film is an in-name-only sequel to Massimo Dallamano's Colt 38 Special Squad with different plot, characters and cast.

Plot

Cast

 Antonio Sabato as Marshall Tinto Baragli
 Max Delys as Bruno
 Dagmar Lassander as Rosy
 Giampiero Albertini as Folco Bordoni
 Rik Battaglia as Police Commissioner
 Luciano Rossi as Racket boss
 Daniele Dublino as Lucas
 Luciano Pigozzi as Romolo
 Maurice Poli as Maurice

See also     
 List of Italian films of 1977

References

External links

1977 films
1970s Italian-language films
Films directed by Giuseppe Vari
Italian crime films
Poliziotteschi films
1977 crime films
Films scored by Lallo Gori
1970s Italian films